Fingerplate or finger-plate may refer to:

 Fingerplate (door), item of door furniture
 Fingerplate, small clamping device to hold work while using a drill press.
 Finger plate, part of a rotary-dial telephone that rotates when dialing numbers.